Colonel Jacob Kingsbury (1756–1837) was a career officer in the United States Army.  He was one of the few U.S. Army officers who was a veteran of both the American Revolution and the War of 1812.

Biography
Jacob Kingsbury was born in Norwich, Connecticut on July 6, 1756, to Nathaniel and Sarah Hill Kingsbury.

On July 11, 1775, at the age of 19, he enlisted in the 8th Connecticut Regiment, which was part of the Continental Army in the Siege of Boston.  He was promoted to corporal before the regiment was disbanded on December 16, 1775.

Kingsbury remained in the Continental Army when it was reorganized in January 1776.  He was promoted to sergeant and then was commissioned an ensign in Webb's Additional Continental Regiment on April 26, 1780.  He served until the Continental Army was disbanded on November 3, 1783.  After the war, he became an original member of the Connecticut Society of the Cincinnati.

Post Revolution
After a break in service of almost four years, he was commissioned a lieutenant in the First American Regiment (today known as the 3rd Infantry Regiment) on October 15, 1787.  He served in the ill-fated campaigns of Colonel Josiah Harmar (in 1790) and General Arthur St. Clair (in 1791) against the Miami Tribe in what is modern-day Ohio.

On January 10 and 11, 1791, Kingsbury distinguished himself at the Siege of Dunlap's Station, where he led a detachment of only 12 soldiers, along with a few settlers, in defending a small outpost against a far superior force of Native Americans.  Following St. Clair's Defeat in November 1791, he was promoted to captain in April 1792 retroactive to December 28, 1791.

Kingsbury was assigned to the 1st Sub-Legion when the Army was re-organized in 1792 and commanded a company in the Battle of Fallen Timbers on August 20, 1794, which decisively defeated the Native Americans in Ohio.  When the Army was re-organized in 1796, the 1st Sub-Legion reverted to being designated as the 1st Infantry Regiment.

Kingsbury was promoted to major in 1797 and lieutenant colonel in 1803.

Early in 1802 he was assigned to command Fort Wilkinson in Georgia, where he was under the command of General James Wilkinson.

In 1805 he established Fort Belle Fontaine on the Missouri River and served there until he was promoted to colonel and placed in command of the 1st Infantry in 1808.

In 1807 Kingsbury was elected to membership in the United States Military Philosophical Society, which was the first professional association of officers of the United States Army.

War of 1812
During the War of 1812, Kingsbury was appointed to command the defenses of Newport, Rhode Island.  He served as Inspector General for Military District No. 2 (comprising the states of Connecticut and Rhode Island) from April 8, 1813, to October 31, 1814.

At the end of the war, Colonel Kingsbury was discharged from the Army on June 15, 1815 after 33 years of service to his country.

He died on July 1, 1837, at his home in Franklin, Connecticut.  He is buried in the Plains Cemetery in Franklin.

Family
He married Sally Palmer Ellis (1778–1857), by whom he had five sons and three daughters:

 Eliza Rosanna Thayer Kingsbury (1800–1800); died in infancy. 
 James Wilkinson Kingsbury (1801–1853); graduated from West Point in 1823.  Served with distinction during the Black Hawk War and resigned from the army in 1836 to become keeper of U.S. military stores in St. Louis. He was the father of Mary Virginia Kingsbury, who married in 1865 French aristocrat Armand François Robert Comte de Giverville.
 Julia Ann Ellis Kingsbury (born 1804)
 Thomas Humphrey Cushing Kingsbury (1806–1880); colonel of the 11th Connecticut Infantry during the American Civil War.
 William Eustis Kingsbury (1809–1835); collector of the Port of Presque Isle, Pennsylvania.
 Benjamin Ellis Kingsbury (1812–1813); died in infancy.
 Sarah Hill Kingsbury (1815–1840)
 Charles Ellis Kingsbury (born 1818); commissioned 2nd lieutenant in the 2nd Dragoons in 1836.  Died in Florida in 1837.

Dates of rank

Continental Army service
Private, 8th Connecticut Infantry – July 11, 1775
Corporal, 8th Connecticut Infantry – c. 1775
Discharged – December 16, 1775 
Sergeant, Selden's Connecticut State Regiment – June 1776
Discharged – December 1776
Ensign, Webb's Additional Continental Regiment – April 26, 1780
Ensign, 3rd Connecticut Regiment – January 1, 1781
Ensign, Swift's Connecticut Regiment – June 1783
Discharged – November 3, 1783

United States Army service
Lieutenant, United States Infantry Regiment – October 15, 1787
Captain, 1st Infantry – December 28, 1791
Major, 2nd Infantry – May 15, 1797
Lieutenant colonel, 1st Infantry – April 11, 1803
Colonel, 1st Infantry – August 18, 1808
Colonel, inspector general – April 8, 1813 to October 31, 1814
Discharged – June 15, 1815

Legacy
Colonel Kingsbury's papers are located at the Missouri Historical Society Archives.

References

External links
 The Society of the Cincinnati
 The American Revolution Institute

1755 births
1837 deaths
American people of the Northwest Indian War
Military personnel from Norwich, Connecticut
People from Franklin, Connecticut
United States Army officers